Indotyphlops exiguus, the Belgaum worm snake, is a harmless blind snake species found in India. No subspecies are currently recognized.

Geographic range
Found in southwestern India where it is known only from Belgaum in the state of Karnataka. The type locality given is "Indes orientalis" [East Indies].

References

Further reading

 Boulenger GA. 1893. Catalogue of the snakes in the British Museum (Nat. Hist.) I. London (Taylor & Francis), 448 pp.
 Jan G. 1864. Iconogr. gén. Ophid., 1 (3. livr.): 3.
 Werner F. 1921. Synopsis der Schlangenfamilie der Typhlopiden auf Grund des Boulenger'schen Schlangenkatalogs (1893-1896). Archiv für Naturgeschichte 87A: 266-330.

External links
 

Indotyphlops
Reptiles described in 1864